Kingsley Tyrone James (born 17 February 1992) is an English former football player and coach.

A former Sheffield United youth team captain, he switched to Port Vale in summer 2011. He was loaned out to Chasetown in October 2011. He joined Hereford United on loan in January 2013. Port Vale were promoted out of League Two in 2012–13, and he left the "Valiants" to play for Hereford on a permanent basis. He represented England at semi-professional level. He switched to Chester in June 2014 and then FC Halifax Town in July 2015. He played for Halifax in their 2016 FA Trophy final victory over Grimsby Town, before he joined Macclesfield Town in July 2016. He played in the Macclesfield's defeat at the 2017 FA Trophy Final, and then returned to Chester in June 2017. He spent the second half of the 2017–18 campaign on loan at Barrow after Chester were unable to pay his wages. He signed with Guiseley in July 2018, and played for the club in the 2019 West Riding County Cup final. He joined Gainsborough Trinity in May 2019. He switched to Hyde United in June 2020 and was loaned out to Farsley Celtic in November 2020.

Club career

Sheffield United
James began his career as a youth team player at Championship club Sheffield United, after joining at the age of ten he went on to captain the likes of Kyle Naughton and Kyle Walker in the youth team. Kevin Blackwell handed him his first team début in the League Cup First Round 2–0 defeat by Hartlepool United at Victoria Park on 11 August 2010 – he was replaced by Jamie Ward on 66 minutes. This would prove to be his only appearance for the club, and he and teammate Phil Roe followed former United manager Micky Adams to League Two side Port Vale in July 2011. Adams pursued the youngster despite having refused to offer him a new contract as United manager.

Port Vale
He missed the start of the 2011–12 season due to a knee injury. He joined Chasetown of the Northern Premier League Premier Division on loan on 20 October. He scored on his Chasetown début in the FA Trophy, then followed this up with two goals on his league début at Marine. He played a further five games without scoring, before returning to Vale Park in December. James made his Port Vale deébut on 7 January 2012, replacing Gareth Owen 63 minutes into a 3–0 defeat at Southend United. He was given his first start against Shrewsbury Town at the New Meadow on 27 March, but the match was abandoned after 64 minutes due to a fire caused by the failure of the floodlights. He agreed to sign a new one-year deal with the club in June 2012.

He hoped to establish himself in the centre of midfield in the 2012–13 season following the departure of Anthony Griffith. James filled in at centre-back for 45 minutes against Northampton Town at Sixfields on 27 October, after a catalogue of injuries and suspensions left only James and Joe Davis as the two players with any experience of the position. He provided an assist for a Tom Pope goal in a 4–1 win over Wycombe Wanderers on 20 October, his second appearance of the season. He won his first start for the club on 20 November, in a 4–0 win over Bristol Rovers.

Hereford United
On 28 January 2013, he joined Martin Foyle's Hereford United on a one-month loan deal. He made eight Conference National starts for the "Bulls", and his loan spell was extended until the end of the 2012–13 campaign. He became a key member of the first team, and scored his first goal for the club on 1 April, in a 5–2 win over Tamworth at Edgar Street. He played 21 games for Hereford, before returning to Vale in time to see the club promoted into League One. He was not offered a new contract at the end of the season and was released as a free agent.

After leaving Port Vale, James began training with Hereford in July 2013, and signed a one-year contract the following month. He made 23 appearances in the 2013–14 campaign.

Chester
James signed a one-year contract with Steve Burr's Chester in June 2014. He scored three goals in 46 appearances during the 2014–15 campaign, and elected to leave the "Seals" following a strong first half and finish to the season which attracted interest from clubs in the English Football League.

Halifax
James turned down a two-year contract from Chester to move to a club closer to his Barnsley home, and in July 2015 joined National League side FC Halifax Town. Halifax were forced to pay Chester £8,000 compensation with a 20% sell-on clause following a tribunal. He scored 11 goals in 57 appearances across the 2015–16 campaign as Halifax were relegated in 21st place, one point short of safety. He did though play at Wembley Stadium in the FA Trophy final, coming on as a 74th-minute substitute for Scott McManus as Halifax beat Grimsby Town 1–0.

Macclesfield Town
James was sold to Macclesfield Town for an undisclosed fee in July 2016, and signed a one-year contract. He made 48 appearances across the 2016–17 campaign, including in the 2017 FA Trophy Final at Wembley Stadium, where Macclesfield were beaten 3–2 by York City.

Return to Chester
In June 2017, James rejected Macclesfield's offer of a new deal and instead re-signed with Chester after agreeing to a two-year contract; he was the third Macclesfield player to move to the Deva Stadium that summer. However the "Seals" struggled to pay his wages due to financial difficulties, and on 16 February he was sent on loan to divisional relegation rivals Barrow. He made a good impression at Holker Street, and quickly earned praise from assistant manager Jamie Day. He proved to be a key player for Adrian Pennock's "Bluebirds", who managed to avoid relegation at the expensive of parent club Chester. Speaking before the match between Chester and Barrow towards the end of the campaign, James said that "My sole focus is on Barrow, that's where I'm playing at the minute. Whatever has happened with Chester, it's not personal, it's just business". His contract with Chester was cancelled by mutual consent on 4 July. Manager Anthony Johnson praised James for accepting the settlement on his contract, which had been taking up a significant portion of the club's wage budget.

Guiseley
On 10 July 2018, James signed with National League North side Guiseley. On 22 September, he scored a first-half hat-trick as the "Lions" recorded a 4–0 victory over Staveley Miners Welfare in the second qualifying round of the FA Cup. He went on to play for Guiseley in their FA Cup Second Round match defeat to League One side Fleetwood Town, televised on BT Sport. He scored six goals in 40 appearances across the 2018–19 campaign, as Guiseley went on to reach the final of the West Riding County Cup, which they lost to Ossett United. He left Guiseley in May 2019.

Gainsborough Trinity
On 22 May 2019, James joined Northern Premier League Premier Division side Gainsborough Trinity; assistant manager Ross Hannah described the signing as a "big coup" for the "Holy Blues". As a result of the COVID-19 pandemic in England, the 2019–20 season was formally abandoned on 26 March, with all results from the season being expunged.

Hyde United
On 10 June 2020, James signed with Hyde United. "Tigers" manager David McGurk said that "he works with me and John with our coaching company so we know he's the exact type of character we want". On 6 November 2020, James arrived on loan at Farsley Celtic in the National League North, who were able to continue to play whilst Hyde were shut down during the second national coronavirus lockdown. He never made an appearance at The Citadel however and the 2020–21 season was soon curtailed for both Hyde and Celtic. He retired on 1 September 2021.

International career
James scored on his debut for the England C team against Estonia under-23's on 18 November 2014.

Coaching career
James has coached youth players at Sheffield United, Port Vale and Hereford United. On 19 November 2021, he joined York City as a first-team coach.  On 16 November 2022, manager John Askey was sacked and James left the club shortly afterwards.

Personal life
Although many of his friends and family were Rotherham United fans, James supported Manchester United as a boy. He married Emily on 21 May 2016, the day before he played for Halifax in the 2016 FA Trophy Final.

Career statistics

Honours
Port Vale
League Two third-place promotion: 2012–13

F.C. Halifax Town
FA Trophy: 2016

Macclesfield Town
FA Trophy runner-up: 2017

Guiseley
West Riding County Cup runner-up: 2019

References

External links

1992 births
Living people
Footballers from Rotherham
English footballers
Association football midfielders
Sheffield United F.C. players
Port Vale F.C. players
Chasetown F.C. players
Hereford United F.C. players
Chester F.C. players
FC Halifax Town players
Macclesfield Town F.C. players
Barrow A.F.C. players
Guiseley A.F.C. players
Gainsborough Trinity F.C. players
Farsley Celtic F.C. players
English Football League players
Northern Premier League players
National League (English football) players
England semi-pro international footballers
Association football coaches
York City F.C. non-playing staff
People educated at Wath Academy